Der grüne Kakadu is a one act grotesque by Arthur Schnitzler. It was written in 1898 and premiered on 1 March 1899, together with his plays Paracelsus and Die Gefährtin, at the Vienna Burgtheater. The play thematises the indistinguishability of truth and lies, of appearance and reality.

Characters 
 Emile Duke of Cadignan
 François Viscount de Nogeant
 Albin Chevalier de la Tremouille
 The Marquis of Lansac
 Séverine, his wife
 Rollin, poet
 Prospère, host, former theatre director
 His troupe: Henri, Balthasar, Guillaume, Scaevola, Jules, Etienne, Maurice, Georgette, Michette, Flipotte
 Léocadie, actress, Henri's wife 
 Grasset, philosopher
 Lebrêt, tailor
 Grain, a thug
 The Commissary
 Noblemen, actors, actresses
 Burghers and burgesses

Plot 
Paris 1789: Prospère, a former theatre director, runs a dive called "The Green Cockatoo". Many unsuccessful actors, Prospère's former employees, are regulars. But the tavern is also frequented by aristocrats. They hope to get the pleasant thrill of being among real street hustlers and other riffraff. So the actors play criminals. They brag to each other about their violent deeds. On 14 July, the day the French Revolution broke out, the real turmoil of the street now enters the scene. Reality and play intermingle, and for the noble spectators as well as for the actors it becomes increasingly difficult to distinguish roles from real people and play from truth.

Adaptations 

 Der grüne Kakadu, an opera by composer Richard Mohaupt which premiered on 16 September 1958.
 Der grüne Kakadu, a 1963 film by Austrian director Michael Kehlmann.

References 

Austrian literature
Plays by Arthur Schnitzler
1899 in theatre
Plays set in France